Maritalea mobilis is a Gram-negative, non-spore-forming bacterium from the genus of Maritalea with a single polar flagellum, which was isolated from coastal seawater in Tianjin in China. Zhangella mobilis was transferred to Maritalea mobilis

References

External links
Type strain of Maritalea mobilis at BacDive -  the Bacterial Diversity Metadatabase

Hyphomicrobiales
Bacteria described in 2009